Hanbin District is a district of the City of Ankang in Shaanxi Province, China and the seat of the city's government. It has a population of 886,393  and an area of 3,645.91 km2. With forests covering 68.8% of its land, the district abounds in natural resources and remains a popular destination of tourism in Shaanxi.

Between the Qinling and the Daba Mountains, Hanbin District is centrally located in Ankang, bordering the counties Ningshan, Hanyin, and Ziyang on the west, Langao and Pingli on the south, Xunyang on the east, and Zhen'an on the north. Three expressways (G65, G7011, and G4213), three railways (Yangpingguan-Ankang, Xiangyang-Chongqing, Xi'an-Ankang) and an airport make Hanbin a transportation hub in the Shaannan region.

Human settlement in what is called Hanbin District today dates back to the Neolithic period over 7,000 years ago. In 312 BC, a Xicheng County was instituted by the Qin state here, marking the beginning of the area's countyhood.  From the 4th century BC to the late 20th century, it was a county under various dynasties and regimes, until being established as a county-level city in 1988, and finally became a district of the prefectural City of Ankang in 2000.

Administrative divisions
As 2019, Hanbin District is divided to 4 subdistricts and 24 towns.
Subdistricts

Towns

References

Districts of Shaanxi
Ankang